Hartington is a city in Cedar County, Nebraska, United States. The population was 1,514 at the 2020 census.

History
Hartington was platted in 1883, as a water stop on the railroad. It was named for Lord Hartington, who had then recently paid a visit to the U.S.

Historic buildings
Hartington includes a number of historic buildings. These include three brick structures on the National Register of Historic Places: the Prairie School Hartington City Hall and Auditorium (1921-1923), the Romanesque Revival Cedar County Courthouse (1890-1891), and the Colonial Revival Hartington Hotel (1917).

Geography
Hartington is located at  (42.621027, -97.263953).

Hartington is served by Nebraska State Highways 57 and 84.

Climate

Demographics

2010 census
At the 2010 census there were 1,554 people, 641 households, and 402 families living in the city. The racial make-up of the city was 99.2% White, 0.1% African American, 0.2% Native American, 0.1% Asian, 0.1% from other races, and 0.3% from two or more races. Hispanic or Latino of any race were 0.5%.

Of the 641 households 28.4% had children under the age of 18 living with them, 56.5% were married couples living together, 4.4% had a female householder with no husband present, 1.9% had a male householder with no wife present, and 37.3% were non-families. 34.8% of households were one person and 21.3% were one person aged 65 or older. The average household size was 2.34 and the average family size was 3.08.

The median age was 42.6 years. 26.1% of residents were under the age of 18; 6.1% were between the ages of 18 and 24; 19.7% were from 25 to 44; 21.9% were from 45 to 64; and 26.2% were 65 or older. The gender makeup of the city was 49.8% male and 50.2% female.

2000 census
At the 2000 census there were 1,640 people, 670 households, and 416 families living in the city. The population density was 1,821.5 people per square mile (703.6/km). There were 738 housing units at an average density of 819.7 per square mile (316.6/km).  The racial makeup of the city was 99.15% White, 0.12% Native American, 0.06% from other races, and 0.67% from two or more races. Hispanic or Latino of any race were 0.24%.

Of the 670 households 30.1% had children under the age of 18 living with them, 55.4% were married couples living together, 4.3% had a female householder with no husband present, and 37.9% were non-families. 34.5% of households were one person and 22.1% were one person aged 65 or older. The average household size was 2.36 and the average family size was 3.12.

The age distribution was 27.3% under the age of 18, 6.1% from 18 to 24, 22.4% from 25 to 44, 18.3% from 45 to 64, and 25.9% 65 or older. The median age was 40 years. For every 100 females, there were 96.4 males. For every 100 females age 18 and over, there were 88.0 males.

The median household income was $33,365, and the median family income  was $43,897. Males had a median income of $30,848 versus $18,452 for females. The per capita income for the city was $16,133. About 1.7% of families and 6.2% of the population were below the poverty line, including 2.0% of those under age 18 and 11.1% of those age 65 or over.

Notable people
Ralph G. Brooks - 29th Governor of Nebraska
 Dwight W. Burney, 30th Governor of Nebraska
 Willard H. Burney, member of the Nebraska House of Representatives
 Russ Hochstein, American football guard for the Kansas City Chiefs
 James Lee Rankin, United States Solicitor General 1956-61
 Charles Thone, U.S. Representative 1971–79, governor of Nebraska 1979-83

See also
 Hartington City Hall and Auditorium

References

External links

 City of Hartington (Official Site)
 Hartington Chamber of Commerce
 Hartington-Newcastle Public Schools
 Cedar Catholic School

Cities in Cedar County, Nebraska
Cities in Nebraska
County seats in Nebraska